The 2017 FIM CEV Moto2 European Championship was the eighth CEV Moto2 season and the third under the FIM banner.

Calendar
The following races were scheduled to take place in 2017.

Entry list

 * Superstock 600

Championship standings

References

External links
 

FIM CEV Moto2 European Championship
2017 in motorcycle sport